The Women's 50 metre rifle three positions event at the 2016 Olympic Games took place on 11 August 2016 at the National Shooting Center.

The event consisted of two rounds: a qualifier and a final. In the qualifier, each shooter fired 60 shots with a .22 Long Rifle at 50 metres distance. 20 shots were fired each from the standing, kneeling, and prone positions. Scores for each shot were in increments of 1, with a maximum score of 10.

The top 8 shooters in the qualifying round moved on to the final round. There, they fired an additional 45 shots, 15 from each position. These shots scored in increments of .1, with a maximum score of 10.9. Eliminations occurred beginning after the 40th shot.

Records
Prior to this competition, the existing world and Olympic records were as follows.

Qualification round

Final

References

External links

Shooting at the 2016 Summer Olympics
Olym
Women's events at the 2016 Summer Olympics
Women's 050m 3 positions 2016